Liz Jensen (born 1959) is an English novelist.

Liz Jensen was born in Oxfordshire, the daughter of a Danish father and an Anglo-Moroccan mother. She studied English at Somerville College, Oxford. She first worked as a radio journalist in Taiwan, and then for the BBC as a TV and radio producer. She then worked as a sculptor in France, where she wrote her first novel, Egg Dancing (1995), returning to London to  write Ark Baby (1998), The Paper Eater (2000), and War Crimes for the Home (2002)

She was elected a Fellow of the Royal Society of Literature in 2005.

Her novel The Ninth Life of Louis Drax was adapted into a Canadian film in 2016.

Novels 

 Egg Dancing (1995)
 Ark Baby (1997)
 Paper Eater (2000)
 War Crimes for the Home (2002)
 The Ninth Life of Louis Drax (2004)
 My Dirty Little Book of Stolen Time: A Novel (2006)
 The Rapture (2009)
 The Uninvited (2012)

References

External links
 Liz Jensen's Home Page
 The secret of writing a novel, article written by Jensen in The Guardian
 Review of The Ninth Life of Louis Drax in The Independent
 Review of My Dirty Little Book of Stolen Time in The Independent
  The Ninth Life of Louis Drax at Tin House Books 
 The Otherworlds of Liz Jensen: a Critical Reading, by Helen E. Mundler. Camden House, New York, 13 September 2016.

1959 births
People from Oxfordshire
English women novelists
Living people
Fellows of the Royal Society of Literature
English people of Moroccan descent
Alumni of Somerville College, Oxford